John Burns FRS MIF (13 November 1775 – 18 June 1850) was a Scottish surgeon.

Life

He was the eldest son of Elizabeth Stevenson and Rev. John Burns, who was the minister of the Barony Church in Glasgow.

Burns became a visiting surgeon at Glasgow Royal Infirmary and the proprietor of the College Street medical school. He was suspected in robbing graves to provide cadavres for dissecting studies. In 1799, he became Professor of Anatomy and Theory at Anderson's University, where he published several text books for students and became an international authority on abortion and midwifery.

In 1815 he was appointed the first Regius Professor of Surgery at the University of Glasgow.

He lived at 5 Blythswood Square in the north of the city.

Burns, the brother of two senior figures in the MacBrayne's and Cunard shipping businesses, was among fifty people who died when the G & J Burns paddle steamship Orion sank off Portpatrick in June 1850 on its way from Liverpool to Glasgow.

Publications
Principles of Midwifery (1809)
Principles of Christian Philosophy
Christian Fragments

Family

In 1801 he married Isabella Duncan, daughter of Rev. John Duncan of Alva and had four children. Their first child, John (born 1806) was a member of the 78th Highlanders and later Lieutenant-Colonel of the 2nd Royals and died in service at the Cape in 1853, unmarried. Their second son, Allan (born 1819), was a physician and died in 1843 by typhoid fever which he caught from a patient.

References

 The Old Country Houses of the Old Glasgow Gentry, John Guthrie Smith and John Oswald Mitchell, 1878. This title on Glasgow Digital Library

1775 births
1850 deaths
Fellows of the Royal Society
Deaths due to shipwreck at sea
Scottish surgeons
Academics of the University of Glasgow
Scottish religious writers
Scottish medical writers